Urocteana is a genus of spiders in the family Oecobiidae. It was first described in 1961 by Roewer. , it contains only one species, Urocteana poecilis, from Senegal.

References

Oecobiidae
Monotypic Araneomorphae genera
Spiders of Africa
Taxa named by Carl Friedrich Roewer